This is a discography of the English pop punk band Busted. It consists of four studio albums, one live album, one compilation album, fourteen singles and fourteen music videos.

The band's debut album Busted was released by Island Records in the UK in September 2002 and peaked at number two on the UK Albums Chart and has been certified triple platinum by the British Phonographic Industry. It also peaked at number five on the Irish Albums Chart. The album spawned four singles, "What I Go to School For", "Year 3000", "You Said No" and "Sleeping with the Light On". They all charted in the top three of the UK Singles Chart, with "You Said No" reaching number one and three of them reaching the top five in Ireland.

Busted's second album A Present for Everyone was released in 2003 and spawned four top-two singles in the UK, "Crashed the Wedding", "Who's David?", "Air Hostess" and the double A-side "Thunderbirds / 3AM". The album itself peaked at number two in the UK, number nine in Ireland, and was also certified triple platinum by the BPI. This was followed in 2004 by a United States-only album which was again titled Busted. It featured tracks from both of their previous UK albums. In November 2004, Busted released a live album, A Ticket for Everyone: Busted Live, which features live recordings from their 2004 tour.

Albums

Studio albums

Live albums

Compilation album

Extended play

Singles

Promotional singles

Music videos

Notes

References

General
 
Specific

Discography
Discographies of British artists
Pop punk group discographies